The 1905–06 Columbia men's ice hockey season was the 10th season of play for the program.

Season
Graduate student and former varsity player Rudolph Von Bernuth served as the team's coach while K. M. Spence served as team manager.

Note: Columbia University adopted the Lion as its mascot in 1910.

Roster

Standings

Schedule and Results

|-
!colspan=12 style=";" | Regular Season

References

Columbia Lions men's ice hockey seasons
Columbia
Columbia
Columbia
Columbia